Jaleel Khan (born 10 December 1954), is an Indian politician from the state of Andhra Pradesh. He was MLA of Vijayawada West constituency.

He was elected as MLA from YSR Congress in 2014 state assembly elections, beating his nearest rival, V. Srinivas, by a narrow margin. Later in the 2016 he joined ruling Telugu Desam Party. He was also elected as MLA  through the INC party in 1999.

Mr. Khan was among the most expected to get cabinet berth during the recent shuffle. But things did not work out as expected for him. AP Chief Minister, Mr. Chandrababu Naidu, without further ado, has nominated Jaleel Khan as AP Waqf Board Chairman. This is a very prominent position among Muslim minorities.

Controversies
On 23 April 2016, he allegedly directed his henchmen to attack reporter of a daily newspaper for taking pictures when he was having an argument with masjid committee members at a meeting at Tarapet in Vijayawada.

On 27 December 2016, during an interview with an online channel, he said that he studied physics in B.com. This part of interview went viral and made him popular overnight. And this video and spoofs on this video were trending online for many days and many jokes were made on him and B.com. Physics even until today. Telugu Desam party named him chairman of Waqf board, Andhra Pradesh.

References

1954 births
Living people
YSR Congress Party politicians
Politicians from Vijayawada
Andhra Pradesh MLAs 2014–2019
Telugu Desam Party politicians